Calhoun High School is a public high school in Calhoun, Georgia, United States, serving grades 9-12 for the Calhoun City School District.  It is accredited by the Georgia Accrediting Commission and the Southern Association of Colleges and Schools, and is a member of Georgia High School Association. It is located near downtown Calhoun in Gordon County.

Awards 

Calhoun was named a Silver Medal school in the "Best High Schools" category by U.S. News & World Report in 2009.

The Calhoun debate team won the 2008-2009 state debate championship (AA). The Calhoun teams combined for a 9-3 record against other finalists from single-A through triple-A schools, which gave them the AA division title.

Athletics 

Calhoun offers basketball, baseball, competition cheerleading, cross country, football, golf, soccer, softball, swim team, tennis, track, wrestling, and volleyball. Several teams, including softball, baseball, golf, football, track, and cheerleading, have won state championships. As of the 2020-2021 regional alignments by GHSA, Calhoun High School is in Georgia Region 7-AAAAA.

The team mascot (the Yellow Jacket) was chosen due to the school's proximity to the Georgia Institute of Technology.  Each year Calhoun pays royalties of 1 US dollar to Georgia Tech for the use of the mascot and its likeness.  Calhoun calls its mascot "Stinger" rather than "Buzz".

Football

Calhoun football home games are played at Phil Reeve Stadium on the school campus near downtown.  The stadium is named for C.P. "Phil" Reeve, the guitar player and founding member of the Georgia Yellow Hammers, an early 20th-century "old-time" band from Gordon County. 
The Jackets won their first football state title since the 1952 season in 2011 with a 27-24 overtime victory against Buford. The Yellow Jackets won 19 straight region titles (2001–2018), and have made the Georgia State Football Playoffs every year since the 2000 season.  
 State championships - 1952 (class C), 2011 (AA), 2014 (AAA), 2017 (AAA) .
 Region titles - 1950, 1951, 1995, 2001, 2002, 2003, 2004, 2005, 2006, 2007, 2008, 2009, 2010, 2011, 2012, 2013,2014, 2015, 2016, 2017, 2018, 2022.

Baseball

The baseball team has won three state titles (2000, 2005, 2010).

 State championships - 1974 (A), 2000 (A), 2005 (AA). 2010 (AA) 
 Region titles -1968, 1973, 1974, 1996, 1997, 2001, 2005, 2007, 2008, 2009, 2010, 2012, 2014 

Girls' softball

The Lady Jackets softball team has won four state championships (back-to-back-to-back, the only sport in Calhoun history to win three in a row).
2013 (AA), 2014 (AAA), 2015 (AAA), 2017 (AAA) . The Lady Jackets were State Runner-Ups in 1998, 2008, and 2016. The Lady Jackets have won region titles in 1987, 1995, 1998, 1999, 2000,2007, 2008, 2012, 2013, 2014, 2015, 2016 and 2018 .

Cheerleading

Calhoun High School Competition Cheerleaders won state championships in 2006, 2007, 2009, 2010, 2013, and 2014, while receiving state runner-up honors in 2004 and 2008.

Girls' golf

The Lady Jackets golf team has won back-to-back state championships in golf. (2015 AAA, 2016 AAA)

Notable alumni 
 Charlie Culberson, Major League Baseball player for the Texas Rangers & 2015 inductee into the Calhoun-Gordon County Sports Hall of Fame
 Kris Durham, former NFL player
 Antonio Fleming, former NFL player
 Adam Griffith, former Alabama Crimson Tide placekicker
 Riley Gunnels, former NFL player
 James Beverly Langford, Georgia state legislator
 Monty Powell, country songwriter, producer for Alabama, Diamond Rio, Tim McGraw, and Keith Urban
 Da'Rick Rogers, former NFL player and current wide receiver for the Toronto Argonauts of the Canadian Football League
 Josh Smoker, MLB player who played for the New York Mets
 Baylon Spector, NFL linebacker for the Buffalo Bills

References 

Public high schools in Georgia (U.S. state)
Schools in Gordon County, Georgia
1902 establishments in Georgia (U.S. state)
Educational institutions established in 1902